Muddy Creek is a stream in the U.S. state of Ohio. It is a tributary to the Little Miami River.

Muddy Creek was so named on account of the muddy character of its water.

References

Rivers of Warren County, Ohio
Rivers of Ohio